Sullivan Joseph Fortner (born December 29, 1986) is an American jazz pianist. He was the regular pianist in trumpeter Roy Hargrove's band from 2010 to 2017, and has released two albums on Impulse! Records.

Early life
Fortner was born and grew up in New Orleans. He started playing the piano from the age of four. He was inspired to play by seeing a woman playing the organ in a local church. His mother was the choir director of a Baptist church; he began playing the organ there at the age of seven. For a time, he relied on his perfect pitch to learn and play music; this had to change when he successfully auditioned for the New Orleans Center for Creative Arts. Fortner went on to obtain a bachelor's degree from the Oberlin Conservatory of Music and a master's degree from the Manhattan School of Music.

Later life and career
In 2009, Fortner was part of vibraphonist Stefon Harris' band, including for a tour of Europe. Fortner was pianist in trumpeter Roy Hargrove's quintet from 2010 to 2017. Fortner became strongly influenced by fellow pianist Barry Harris from 2011, when he realised that his knowledge of the music was too shallow. Fortner recorded with the Hargrove band's saxophonist, Justin Robinson, in 2013. In 2015, Fortner was the winner of the American Pianists Association Cole Porter Fellowship in Jazz, a prize that consists of "$50,000, the opportunity to record for Mack Avenue Records, and two years of professional career services and development".

In early 2015, Fortner's quartet contained saxophonist Tivon Pennicott, bassist Ameen Saleem and drummer Jeremy "Bean" Clemons. Fortner's first release as leader was Aria from Impulse! Records, and received a four-star review from DownBeat magazine. The next, Moments Preserved, was mainly a trio album, with Saleem and Clemons, but Hargrove also played on three of the tracks. Fortner played on some of the tracks that formed Paul Simon's album In the Blue Light.

Awards and honors
2016: Lincoln Center Award for Emerging Artists 
2016: DownBeat magazine: "25 for the Future"
2020: DownBeat Critics' Poll, Rising Star Arranger

Discography
An asterisk (*) indicates the year the album was released.

As leader

As sideman

References

1986 births
American jazz pianists
American male pianists
Living people
American male jazz musicians
Manhattan School of Music alumni
Oberlin Conservatory of Music alumni
21st-century American pianists
21st-century American male musicians